Gillian Chan (born 1954) is a Canadian children's author who lives in Dundas, Ontario.

She was educated at Orange Hill Grammar School and the University of East Anglia (BEd, 1980).

Chan is also the author of a short diary entry of Chin Mei-ling's during the Christmas week a year or so after the original diary ended for the Christmas treasury from the Dear Canada series, A Season for Miracles: Twelve Tales of Christmas.

On October 27, 2006, Chan competed on the television show Jeopardy!, finishing in last place.

Works
Golden Girl and Other Stories - 1994
Glory Days and Other Stories - 1996 (Nominated for a Governor General's Award)
The Carved Box - 2001
A Foreign Field - 2002
An Ocean Apart: The Gold Mountain Diary of Chin Mei-ling (Dear Canada) - 2004
The Turning - 2005
I Am Canada: A Call to Battle - 2012

References

1954 births
Living people
Alumni of the University of East Anglia
Canadian children's writers
People from Dundas, Ontario
Writers from Hamilton, Ontario